The situation, task, action, result (STAR) format is a technique used by interviewers to gather all the relevant information about a specific capability that the job requires. 

 Situation: The interviewer wants you to present a recent challenging situation in which you found yourself.
 Task: What were you required to achieve? The interviewer will be looking to see what you were trying to achieve from the situation. Some performance development methods use “Target” rather than “Task”. Job interview candidates who describe a “Target” they set themselves instead of an externally imposed “Task” emphasize their own intrinsic motivation to perform and to develop their performance.
  Action: What did you do? The interviewer will be looking for information on what you did, why you did it and what the alternatives were.
 Results: What was the outcome of your actions? What did you achieve through your actions? Did you meet your objectives? What did you learn from this experience? Have you used this learning since?

The STAR technique is similar to the SOARA technique (Situation, Objective, Action, Result, Aftermath).

The STAR technique is also often complemented with an additional R on the end STARR or STAR(R) with the last R resembling reflection. This R aims to gather insight and interviewee's ability to learn and iterate. Whereas the STAR reveals how and what kind of result on an objective was achieved, the STARR with the additional R helps the interviewer to understand what the interviewee learned from the experience and how they would assimilate experiences. The interviewee can define what they would do (differently, the same, or better) next time being posed with a situation.

References

External links
The ‘STAR’ technique to answer behavioral interview questions
The STAR method explained

 
Job interview
Logical consequence
Schedule (project_management)